Bandar Baru Klang (literal translation: Klang New Town) is a modern township located just 2 km away from the Klang town centre in the state of Selangor, Malaysia. Bandar Baru Klang is developed by the Acmar Group. The township falls under the jurisdiction of the Klang Municipal Council (MPK).

Connectivity
Bandar Baru Klang is well connected to the Federal Highway and the North Klang Straits Bypass as well as the North Klang Valley Expressway via North Klang Straits Bypass.

Politics
Bandar Baru Klang is represented in the Parliament by the Member of Parliament for Shah Alam, Khalid Abd Samad. In the State Assembly of Selangor, the township is represented by Mohd Najwan Halimi, the state assemblyman for Kota Anggerik.

Facilities

Hotels

The 488-room Wyndham Acmar Klang is the first upscale international hotel in Klang. The hotel opens in January 2020 and is located next to AEON Shopping Centre Bukit Raja. The construction of the hotel was halted in 1997 due to the Asian Financial Crisis, and was resumed in 2015.

Healthcare
The KPJ Klang Specialist Hospital, a tertiary care hospital is located in the township.

Shopping
There is one shopping centre in Klang Newtown, the AEON Bukit Raja Shopping Centre.

Education
Sekolah Sri Acmar; a private primary and secondary school is located at Persiaran Rajawali. An international school, Acmar International School is slated to open in June 2018.

Government Offices
The office of the Selangor Department Of Director General Of Lands And Mines (Federal) as well as Federal Offices Complex are located on Persiaran Bukit Raja 1.

Sports and Recreation
Klang Executive Club and U One Sports Centre are located within the township.

Future Developments
The 36-kilometer Bandar Utama-Klang Line (interim name) BKL, an LRT extension to the western corridor of Greater KL will passes through the township. The township will be served by Bukit Raja and Kawasan 17 stations.

References

External links
 Klang Municipal Council (MPK)
 Profile of Bandar Baru Klang
 Klang Community eSpace and Forums

Townships in Selangor